The 2018 World Draughts Championship match in international draughts was held from December 28, 2018, to January 13, 2019, in the Netherlands. It was held under the auspices of the International Draughts Federation (FMJD) and played between the current 2017 world champion Alexander Schwartzman and 2016 world champion Roel Boomstra. Roel Boomstra won this match and became World Draughts Champion.

Rules and regulations
The event was played over 12 games with a time control of 80 minutes plus 1 minute per move. The player who has the highest score wins the world title if he wins at least three games. If not, a tie-break will be played. Every victory in a tie-break adds to the total number of victories.

Per regulations, a preliminary tie-breaking games were to be played if the first six games ended in a draw.

Schedule

Results

Regular games

Tie-break games

See also
 Draughts World Championship

References

External links
 2018 World Draughts Championship match

2018 in draughts
2019 in draughts
Draughts world championships
Draughts
Draughts
International sports competitions hosted by the Netherlands
World Draughts
World Draughts
Sports competitions in Assen
Sports competitions in Groningen (city)
Sports competitions in Friesland
Sport in Leeuwarden